The 2011 Florida Gators softball team represented the University of Florida softball program for the 2011 NCAA softball season.

Roster
The 2011 Florida Gators softball team has 5 seniors, 4 juniors, 4 sophomores, and 4 freshmen.

References

Florida Gators softball seasons
2011 in sports in Florida
2011 Southeastern Conference softball season
2011 NCAA Division I softball tournament participants
Women's College World Series seasons